John Edward Maginnis (7 March 1919 – 7 July 2001) was a Northern Irish politician.  He was Ulster Unionist Member of Parliament for Armagh from 1959 until he stood down at the February 1974 general election. He stood unsuccessfully for the Unionist Party of Northern Ireland at the 1975 election to the Northern Ireland Constitutional Convention.

Educated at Moyallon School and Portadown Technical College, he lived and farmed at Mandeville Hall, Tandragee.

References

1919 births
2001 deaths
Members of the Parliament of the United Kingdom for County Armagh constituencies (since 1922)
UK MPs 1959–1964
UK MPs 1964–1966
UK MPs 1966–1970
UK MPs 1970–1974
Ulster Unionist Party members of the House of Commons of the United Kingdom